The following is a list of Sites of Special Scientific Interest in the Western Isles North Area of Search.  For Western Isles South see List of SSSIs in Western Isles South.  For SSSIs elsewhere in Scotland, see List of SSSIs by Area of Search.

 Achmore Bog
 Cnoc A'Chapuill
 Flannan Islands
 Glen Valtos
 Gress Saltings
 Little Loch Roag Valley Bog
 Loch A' Sgurr Pegmatite
 Loch Dalbeg
 Loch Laxavat Ard and Loch Laxavat Iorach
 Loch Meurach
 Loch na Cartach
 Loch nan Eilean Valley Bog
 Loch Orasay
 Loch Scarrasdale Valley Bog
 Loch Siadar
 Loch Stiapavat
 Loch Tuamister
 Luskentyre Banks and Saltings
 Mangersta Sands
 North Harris
 North Rona and Sula Sgeir
 Northton Bay
 Port of Ness
 Shiant Isles
 Small Seal Islands
 Stornoway Castle Woodlands
 Tob Valasay
 Tolsta Head
 Tong Saltings

 
Western Isles North